Digital Remedy (formerly known as CPX Interactive) is a digital media execution and technology company based in New York City that has been in the tech-enabled market space for 20 years. Founder and CEO Michael Seiman launched the company as a senior at Hofstra University and became one of America's Most Promising Companies by Forbes in 2015. The company currently has three U.S. offices, in New York, New Orleans, and Denver, and over 100 employees in client services, media optimization, sales and marketing, corporate, technology, content operations, and data and analytics roles.

History
Digital Remedy- formerly CPXi-was founded in 2000.  It has maintained distinct divisions that evolved in parallel, creating capabilities to meet the challenges faced by marketers, publishers, and influencers, and growing the company to serve its clients.

2000: Mike Seiman, Digital Remedy CEO and chairman, founded BUDs Inc. while a college student studying computer science at Hofstra University in New York.

2005: The company rebranded as CPX Interactive (also called CPXi), paying homage to cost per "x" price modeling.

2011: Established AppNexus partnership; David Zapletal, Digital Remedy EVP Media Optimization, joins the Board of Directors.

2012: Launched Hatched.at, a lab for innovating new digital products and services and bRealTime, offering programmatic solutions for both supply- and demand-side partners.

2013: CPX Interactive rebrands to CPXi and acquires AdReady, a Seattle-based digital media execution partner, providing advertisers and publishers with platform-based services to deliver cross-channel solutions against campaign and performance goals.

2014: Receives $26m in funding from BDCA; CPXi Asia begins as a joint venture in APAC; and Consumed Media- a content production house that developed unique content and engagement strategies for advertisers, publishers, and social influencers- launches.

2016: CPXi divests bRealTime for $48.5m; repays the BDCA loan in full; refinances with Gibraltar Capital for $6m; acquires SpinMedia Entertainment Sites; and ad industry veteran, Tiffany Coletti Kaisers joins the company as EVP Marketing.

2017: CPXi rebrands as Digital Remedy; Nibble launches as a replacement to Consumer Media; SVP of Digital, MNI Targeted Media Inc., Matt Fanelli named to Digital Remedy Board of Directors; and Digital Remedy is TAG validated.

2018: Industry veteran Keith "Kappy" Kaplan joins the Digital Remedy Board of Directors; Donna Speciale joins the Board of Directors adding the unique perspective to the board-traditionally from ad tech and media operations backgrounds- due to her expertise in off- and online media, strategy, and investment; Digital Remedy hires media sales veteran TJ Sullivan for the newly created EVP of Sales role.

2019: David Zapletal is named Digital Remedy's Chief Innovation and Media Officer; Digital Remedy launches new OTT advertising platform, Flip; Programmatic industry veteran, Alex Chatfield, VP of Sale and Account Management for Xandr Invest, joins the Digital Remedy Board of Directors; CEO and Co-founder of Advisr, Quique Nagle, is also welcomed to the Digital Remedy Board.

2020: Digital Remedy celebrates its 20th Anniversary.

2021: David Zapletal is named Digital Remedy's Chief Operating Officer; Entrepreneur, venture partner, investor, and operating resource in the digital media and marketing industry, Gayle Meyers joins the Digital Remedy Board of Directors as a part of the company's growth strategy for 2021 and beyond; Michael Fleischman joins the Digital Remedy Board of Directors after 10 years as CFO.

AdReady Platform 
AdReady is a full-service ad-tech platform designed to move campaigns from the initial RFP and planning stages, through to IO management and trafficking, and finally onto insights, reporting, and renewal. Aids users in media planning, IO and campaign management, omnichannel ad ops execution, multichannel inventory access, data collection and crunching, custom reporting, insights, actions, optimizations, renewals, and campaign expansions.

Flip 
An Over-the-Top advertising platform that delivers full-funnel results, attribution, and Return on Advertising Spend (ROAS) tracking for marketers. Built to help brand marketers, agencies, and ad buyers to accurately measure OTT campaign effectiveness and CPA against KPIs in the streaming TV industry. The platform provides a dashboard to show OTT buyers in real time which campaigns are working across which devices, publishers, demographics, and channels. The Flip platform was named the Best New TV/Streaming Ad Sales Program or Product in the 2021 Digiday Video & TV Awards.

Digital Venture Tech Challenge
Digital Remedy partners with Hofstra University for an annual $100,000 student business-plan contest, formerly known as the Hofstra-CPXi Venture Challenge. The contest began in 2013 and awards the first place student with $12,000 in prize money and $30,000 worth of in-kind services from Digital Remedy. Runner up receives $6,000 and $15,000 worth of in-kind services, and third place receives a $3,500 prize and $5,000 worth of in-kind services.

References

Companies established in 2000
Mass media companies based in New York City